The Drinker is a statue by graffiti artist Banksy that was placed in a small square off Shaftesbury Avenue in central London in 2004. It is a subversive nod to The Thinker by Auguste Rodin.

The Drinker was stolen by "art terrorist" Andy Link (also known as AK47). The 2016 documentary film The Banksy Job is about the work's theft. Three years after Link stole it, the sculpture was taken from Link's garden while he was away.

References

2004 works
Sculptures of men
Statues in the United Kingdom
Stolen works of art
Works by Banksy